Obišovce is a village and municipality in Košice-okolie District in the Kosice Region of eastern Slovakia.

History
In historical records the village was first mentioned in 1289.

Geography
The village lies at an altitude of 297 metres and covers an area of 9.816 km².
It has a population of about 383 people.

Ethnicity
The population is almost entirely Slovak in ethnicity.

Culture
The village has a public library and food facilities.

External links

Villages and municipalities in Košice-okolie District
Šariš